All Out of Love: The Musical is a jukebox musical based on the songs of Australian pop band Air Supply. The musical was created by producers Naomi Toohey and Dale Harrison.
The musical made its world premiere at Resorts World Manila's Newport Performing Arts Theater in Pasay, Manila, Philippines on October 18, 2018. It was scheduled to run until October 28, 2018, but it was given an extended run until November 10, 2018.

Production
All Out of Love is written by Canadian playwright Jim Millan and directed by Jacinta John and Darren Yap. Stephen Amos serves as the music supervisor while Yvette Lee is the musical's choreographer. The musical is produced by Naomi Toohey, Dale Harrison, and Barry Siegel. The Philippines was chosen to host the musical's world premiere due to the country being one of the largest markets for Air Supply's music.

When asked about the concept of his band's songs being made into a musical, Graham Russell said, "It was great. I think it’s overdue. I think it should have happened a long time ago. It’s really nice to see and exciting for it to be happening first in Manila. It’s like our gift here to all the fans here in the Philippines. To begin here, the journey has now begun." Russell also wrote a new song titled "I Was in Love with You" exclusively for the musical.

Premise
In 1980s New York City, Jamie Crimson, a rock star at the peak of his career, is about to embark on a world tour to promote his second album when he suffers an emotional breakdown from having to split from his girlfriend Rayne. This breakdown causes a rift between him and his producer, Tommy King, to the point where he threatens to leave the music industry. Tommy's daughter Stacie, fresh out of graduating from Harvard Business School, decides to save Jamie's career and love life by helping him reunite with Rayne. Meanwhile, rival producer Kurt Swinghammer decides to take advantage of Tommy's stress disorder by proposing to buy out his record label.

Cast

Musical numbers

Original Manila production

Act I
Overture
Bring Out the Magic – The Company
Sweet Dreams — Jamie Crimson
All Out of Love – Jamie Crimson
I Was in Love with You – Jamie Crimson and Rayne
Every Woman in the World — Jamie Crimson and Stacie King
Here I Am (Just When I Thought I Was Over You) — Tommy King
Keeping the Love Alive – Jamie Crimson and Stacie King
Chances — Jamie Crimson, Stacie King and Cabbie
Lonely Is the Night — Cabbie and Company

Act II
Lonely Is the Night (Reprise) – The Company
Lost in Love – Rayne
Two Less Lonely People in the World – Jamie Crimson and Company
The One That You Love – Jamie Crimson and Stacie King
Now and Forever – Jamie Crimson and Rayne
Even the Nights Are Better – The Company
The One That You Love/All Out of Love/Lost in Love (Finale) – The Company

Critical reception
All Out of Love received favorable reviews from theater critics. Robert Encila-Celdran of Broadway World commented on his review: "Surround that cast with an equally talented ensemble and a solid band, put them up on a fabulous multi-level set, provide them with a first-rate creative support, and you just might get away with a middling repertoire beloved by a multitude. And entertain the audience they did; the crowd came in droves to be affirmed, and we know them to be a big part of the journey." Fred Hawson of ABS-CBN commented that "The story is admittedly unremarkable and unoriginal, even corny and cliche at several points. But overall, the show was still very entertaining because of the karaoke familiarity of the songs (you will have to stop yourself from singing along) and the show-stopping performances of the triple-threat Filipino cast." Nikki Francisco of Theater Fans Manila gave an unfavorable review of the musical, commenting that "It’s a simple premise featuring cheesy dialogue that might have been hilarious, but the assembled cast weren’t all that funny, least of all Manalang, who would later make up for it by showing she can sing like nobody’s business in two solo numbers."

Awards and nominations

Manila production

References

External links

2018 musicals
Air Supply
Australian musicals
Jukebox musicals
Philippine musicals